The 2015 Caribbean Series (Serie del Caribe) was the 57th edition of the international competition featuring the champions of the Cuban National Series, Dominican Professional Baseball League, Mexican Pacific League, Puerto Rican Professional Baseball League, and Venezuelan Professional Baseball League. It took place February 2–8 at Hiram Bithorn Stadium in San Juan, Puerto Rico. The teams played a ten-game round robin, followed by the semifinals and championship game.

Round robin

Schedule
Time zone Atlantic Standard Time (UTC–4)

Standings

Playoff round

Semifinals

Final

External links

Official Site

Caribbean
Caribbean Series
2015
International baseball competitions hosted by Puerto Rico
2015 in Caribbean sport
Caribbean Series